Alexander John Knox (born June 21, 1997) is an American soccer player who plays as a defender for FC Tucson in USL League One.

Career

Collegiate
Knox began his collegiate career at Wake Forest University, starting 19 of 25 games and tallying one assist in his freshman season. He then transferred to UCLA, scoring his first collegiate goal as part of a brace against Oregon State. At the end of his junior season, Knox was named amongst the honorable mentions to the Pac-12 All-Academic Team.

Professional
After his collegiate career came to a close, Knox funded a trip to Italy, where he was set to meet with Serie A scouts in hopes of being offered a contract. However, Knox arrived shortly before the COVID-19 pandemic began to emerge in the country, forcing him back to the United States without an offer from a professional outfit. However, Knox would kickstart his professional career in early 2021, reuniting with former youth coach John Galas at FC Tucson. He made his debut for the club on May 16, 2021, coming on as a 78th-minute substitute for Deri Corfe in a 5-1 defeat to Fort Lauderdale.

Career statistics

Club

References

External links
Alex Knox at Pac-12

1997 births
Living people
FC Tucson players
UCLA Bruins men's soccer players
Wake Forest Demon Deacons men's soccer players
USL League One players
American soccer players
Association football defenders
Soccer players from Indianapolis